Sybil Lenora Collins Mobley (October 14, 1925 – September 29, 2015) was Dean Emerita of the Florida Agricultural and Mechanical University (FAMU) School of Business and Industry.

Early life and education

Sybil Collins grew up in Shreveport, La., where her father, Melvin Collins was an educator and founder of the Shreveport Sun newspaper, and her mother was a teacher. She graduated from high school and then attended Bishop College in Texas, where she was an outstanding student.

But opportunities for employment were slim and she accepted a job as a secretary at FAMU in 1945. Years later, she was recognized for her business skills and encouraged to take the graduate school admissions exam, and excelled. She was accepted into the Wharton School of Finance at the University of Pennsylvania, where she made the Dean's List. She was then entered the University of Illinois, where she completed her classwork towards her doctorate in one and a half years.

Career

Mobley rose from the ranks of a professor to department chair (1971-1974) to founding dean of the School of Business and Industry (SBI) from 1974 – 2003 (her fourth baby).  During her tenure as SBI's dean, Dr. Mobley implemented her world-renowned Professional Leadership Development (PLD) Program, a leadership development program designed to teach students behavioral competencies to complement their academic preparation.  To support her innovative PD and academic curricula, Dean Mobley started the SBI Big Board, which consists of over 100 plaques.  Each plaque on the SBI Big Board represents a minimum donation of $100,000 endowed for scholarships.   The earnings from the SBI Big Board accounts still enable SBI to provide scholarships to its "Superstars" today.  As a result of her mega contributions to FAMU, Dr. Mobley received the designation of Dean Emerita upon her retirement.

Legacy and honors

In addition to serving as a master administrator in higher education and being a Certified Public Accountant (CPA) in the State of Florida, Dean Mobley served on the boards of directors of Anheuser-Busch Company, Champion International Corporation, Hershey Foods Corporation, Sears Roebuck & Company, Southwestern Bell Corporation, Dean Witter, and Discover.  Dr. Mobley and her husband, James Mobley, a successful entrepreneur, were also pioneers in the Tallahassee Civil Rights Movement.   Some of Dean Mobley's other affiliations included Alpha Kappa Alpha, the International Association of Black Business Educators, the National Association of Black Accountants, Florida Women's Hall of Fame, and the FAMU SBI Hall of Fame to name a few.  Dr. Mobley served as a consultant to the United States Agency for International Development for multiple African countries, and she was awarded the FAMU Lifetime Achievement Award among numerous other awards. She received a Candace Award from the National Coalition of 100 Black Women in 1982.

Through her tenacious and assiduous efforts, Dean Mobley positively changed the personal, economic, and professional trajectory of hundreds of thousands of individuals, including her students, faculty, and staff – past, present, and future.  Successful SBIans can be found in all industry sectors from education to the C-Suite of multinational corporations, and from entrepreneurs to non-profits all around the globe.  Dean Mobley named the SBI alumni the "SBI Force" because she said that we would be a "force to be reckoned with" in the global economy.  The ripple effects of Dean Mobley's commitment to excellence in business education and the world of business have been and will be felt for decades.

Death

Mobley died in the early morning hours of September 29, 2015, at Tallahassee Memorial Healthcare after a brief illness. She was 89.

References

1925 births
2015 deaths
American university and college faculty deans
Women deans (academic)
Bishop College alumni
People from Shreveport, Louisiana
African-American women academics
American women academics
African-American academics
20th-century African-American people
21st-century African-American people
20th-century African-American women
21st-century African-American women
Gies College of Business alumni
University of Illinois Urbana-Champaign alumni
Wharton School of the University of Pennsylvania alumni